PyBOP (benzotriazol-1-yloxytripyrrolidinophosphonium hexafluorophosphate) is a peptide coupling reagent used in solid phase peptide synthesis. It is used as a substitute for the BOP reagent - avoiding the formation of the carcinogenic waste product HMPA.

See also
 BOP reagent 
 DEPBT, a related reagent that contains no phosphorus-nitrogen bonds 
 HATU
 HBTU

References

Hexafluorophosphates
Peptide coupling reagents
Benzotriazoles
Pyrrolidines
Biochemistry
Biochemistry methods
Reagents for biochemistry
Quaternary phosphonium compounds